Pilodeudorix hamidou is a butterfly in the family Lycaenidae. It is found in Ivory Coast and western and southern Cameroon.

References

Butterflies described in 2004
Deudorigini